Carlos Coy (born October 5, 1970), known professionally as SPM (an initialism for South Park Mexican), is an American rapper, songwriter, founder of Dope House Records, and convicted sex offender. His stage name is derived from the South Park neighborhood in Houston, Texas where he was raised.

Coy started his musical career in 1994. One year later, he, his brother Arthur, and one of their friends founded Dope House Records. Coy debuted as South Park Mexican that same year with the album Hillwood under the same label. 

In 2002, Coy was convicted of aggravated sexual assault of a child and sentenced to 45 years incarceration, and is currently serving his sentence at the Ramsey Unit in Rosharon, Texas. He is eligible for parole in 2024. While incarcerated, he has continued to record music.

Early life
Coy's father Arturo was a Marine from Falfurrias, Texas; Coy's mother dropped out of high school to marry Arturo. Their marriage ended three years after Coy's birth. Coy's sister, Sylvia, described herself as his "mother/sister". He attended various elementary schools, before entering the music magnet program at Welch Middle School. His family moved from southeast Houston to South Park, and he attended Woodson Middle School. He became a crack cocaine dealer during this time (in his early teens). Rapper Scarface (real name Brad Jordan) also attended Woodson. He attended Milby High School until he was expelled in 1987 while in the ninth grade. Coy obtained a GED and enrolled in San Jacinto Junior College for a business 
associate's degree but failed all his classes there. He then worked at a chemical plant for minimum wage, but after being again unemployed he worked as a door-to-door perfume salesman and continued being a crack cocaine dealer.

Career
Coy began his career as a Christian rapper, but felt that doing so made him an outcast. In 1994, Coy started rapping and recording songs as South Park Mexican and SPM. In 1995, Coy, along with his brother Arthur Jr. and friend Jose Antonio Garza from McAllen, Texas, founded his own record label, Dope House Records. As South Park Mexican (SPM), Coy released his debut album, Hillwood, in March 1995. Coy promoted his first album for two years and by 1997 he started working on his second album. He released his second album, Hustle Town, in March 1998. The album became a hit in the Houston underground rap scene.

On December 22, 1998, Coy released his third album, Power Moves: The Table, which garnered mainstream attention. On November 23, 1999, he released his fourth album, "The 3rd Wish: To Rock the World"; its lead single, "High So High" charted at #50 on the Billboard Hot Rap Tracks chart. In February 2000, he signed a joint venture between his label and Universal Music Group which earned him a $500,000 advance and national distribution. Universal released three of Coy's albums: Time is Money and The Purity Album (2000) and Never Change (2001). The Purity Album included the single "You Know My Name", which peaked at #99 on the Billboard R&B chart and #31 on the rap chart. San Antonio Express-News writer Ramiro Burr summarized South Park Mexican's lyrical content in a 2001 profile: "SPM delivers raunchy lyrics about growing up in the barrio and living the party life. But he says he also focuses on working hard and having hope for a better life."

His Universal releases did not gain much mainstream attention; Jason Birchmeier of Allmusic suggested,"Coy's hardcore rapping proved to be too harsh for the masses". His 2002 album Reveille Park, a compilation of freestyles, was released by Dope House. Dope House released two new albums that Coy recorded while incarcerated: When Devils Strike, released in 2006, debuted at #46 on the Billboard 200, and The Last Chair Violinist followed in 2008. Following a six-year hiatus, he released The Son of Norma on September 30, 2014.

Child molestation case

On September 25, 2001, Houston police arrested Coy on a charge of aggravated sexual assault of a child who was then nine years old, but he was released from county jail after posting bail. The incident occurred on Labor Day weekend that year. A Harris County, Texas jury indicted Coy on December 10, 2001, and added another charge over a 1993 incident when he allegedly impregnated a then-13-year-old girl, who later demanded child support payments from him. Two more charges followed in March 2002 for sexual assault of two 14-year-old girls; Coy was held without bail. Coy's trial began on May 8, 2002, when the nine-year-old girl's mother testified that the girl left a sleepover because of abuse. The next day, the girl testified that Coy touched her inappropriately when she was sleeping.

On May 18, 2002, a Houston jury convicted Coy of aggravated sexual assault of a child. He was sentenced to 45 years in prison on May 30 and ordered to pay a $10,000 fine.

As of 2021, Coy is incarcerated in the Ramsey Unit in Rosharon, Texas. Coy is eligible for parole in 2024. His projected release date is April 8, 2047, and his Texas Department of Criminal Justice number is 01110642. 

Coy maintains his innocence in this case and there are persistent messages from online posters calling for his release.

Discography

Solo albums

Collaboration albums
Wanted with Lone Star Ridaz (2001)
40 Dayz/40 Nightz with Lone Star Ridaz (2002)

Compilation albums
Lone Star Ridaz with Happy P (2000)
The Purity Album (2000)
Pocos Pero Locos Presents the SPM Hits (2013)

Mixtapes
Screwston: The Day Houston Died (2001)
Screwston Vol. 2: Pink Soda (2001)
Screwston Vol. 3: Stuck in da Mud (2002)

Soundtrack albums
Latin Throne (1999)

Singles

Guest appearances

See also
 History of the Mexican-Americans in Houston

References

1970 births
21st-century American criminals
Drug dealers
American music industry executives
American prisoners and detainees
American people convicted of child sexual abuse
American rappers of Mexican descent
Living people
Prisoners and detainees of Texas
Rappers from Houston
Underground rappers
Universal Records artists
San Jacinto College alumni
Gangsta rappers
21st-century American rappers